Lullaby of Broadway was a 10" LP album of songs sung by Doris Day which was released on March 5, 1951 under catalog number CL-6168. The songs on the album were taken from the soundtrack of the movie of the same name in which she starred.

Track listing
"Lullaby of Broadway" (Harry Warren, Al Dubin) (with the Norman Luboff Choir and the Buddy Cole Quartet) (recorded December 8, 1950) - 2:29
"Fine and Dandy" (Kay Swift, Paul James†) (with the Norman Luboff Choir and the Buddy Cole Quartet) (recorded December 8, 1950) - 2:49
"In a Shanty in Old Shanty Town" (Ira Schuster, Jack Little/Joe Young) (with the Norman Luboff Choir and the Buddy Cole Quartet) (recorded December 8, 1950) - 2:55
"Somebody Loves Me" (George Gershwin, Buddy DeSylva, Ballard MacDonald) (with the Frank Comstock Orchestra) (recorded December 4, 1950) - 2:49
"Just One of Those Things" (Cole Porter) (with the Frank Comstock Orchestra) (recorded December 4, 1950)
"You're Getting to Be a Habit with Me" (Warren, Dubin) (with the Frank Comstock Orchestra) (recorded December 4, 1950)
"I Love the Way You Say Goodnight" (Edward Pola, George Wyle) (with the Norman Luboff Choir and the Buddy Cole Quartet) (recorded December 8, 1950)
"Please Don't Talk About Me When I'm Gone" (Sam H. Stept, Sidney Clare) (with the Frank Comstock Orchestra) (recorded December 4, 1950)

†Paul James was the pseudonym of Swift's husband James Warburg.

This album, combined with Tea for Two, was reissued in compact disc form in 2001.

1951 soundtrack albums
Film soundtracks
Doris Day soundtracks
Columbia Records soundtracks